Nowgong Sports Club Ground (known as Nurul Amin Stadium; Assamese: নুৰুল আমিন ক্ৰীড়াক্ষেত্ৰ) is a multipurpose stadium in Nagaon, Assam. The ground is mainly used for organizing matches of football, cricket and other sports. It hosts the prestigious Independence Day Cup Football tournament every year in August and September, in which most of the teams of national repute participate.

The stadium has hosted eight Ranji Trophy matches from 1964 when Assam cricket team played against Bihar cricket team until 1989 but since then the stadium has hosted non-first-class matches. The stadium is named after Nurul Amin, who was a renowned sports administrator in Assam.

References

External links 
 Cricketarchive
 Cricinfo

Sports venues in Assam
Football venues in Assam
Cricket grounds in Assam
Sports venues completed in 1958
1958 establishments in Assam
20th-century architecture in India